

60001–60100 

|-
| 60001 Adélka ||  || Adélka Kotková (born 2006), daughter of astronomer Lenka Kotková, who discovered this minor planet || 
|-id=006
| 60006 Holgermandel ||  || Holger Mandel (born 1957), German astronomer at the Landessternwarte Heidelberg and an honorary member of the Starkenburg-Sternwarte. He is the manager of the LUCIFER project, which has designed two multi-mode instruments for the Large Binocular Telescope. The name was suggested by Erwin Schwab. || 
|-id=008
| 60008 Jarda ||  || Jaroslav Kotek (born 1956), husband of astronomer Lenka Kotková, who discovered this minor planet. He is a lighting engineer, engaged in the protection of the night-sky from light pollution. He has created a real home for the discoverer and fosters her work in astronomy. || 
|}

60101–60200 

|-id=148
| 60148 Seanurban ||  || Sean E. Urban (born 1962) has made significant advances to astrometry, including completion of the reductions of the 22,000 Astrographic Catalogue plates. These data formed the basis of proper motions for the most important reference star catalogs of the late 20th and early 21st centuries, including Tycho-2 and the UCAC. || 
|-id=150
| 60150 Zacharias ||  || Norbert (born 1957) and Marion I. (born 1960) Zacharias made important contributions to the link between the radio and optical reference frames and were instrumental in producing the US Naval Observatory's CCD Astrograph Catalog (UCAC) series of reference star catalogs widely used in the astronomical community. || 
|-id=183
| 60183 Falcone ||  || Giovanni Falcone (1939–1992), an Italian magistrate who fought against organized crime || 
|-id=186
| 60186 Las Cruces ||  || The US city of Las Cruces, New Mexico. It was founded in 1848 at a site along the Rio Grande river and has grown from a small settlement of about 120 persons to a city that is home to agriculture, industry and New Mexico State University. The clear, dry climate and elevation has attracted a number of astronomical observatories to the area (Src). || 
|}

60201–60300 

|-bgcolor=#f2f2f2
| colspan=4 align=center | 
|}

60301–60400 

|-bgcolor=#f2f2f2
| colspan=4 align=center | 
|}

60401–60500 

|-id=406
| 60406 Albertosuci ||  || Alberto Suci (born 1937), an Italian amateur astronomer who is very active in observing the sky and popularizing astronomy in schools and cultural associations. He is the founder of the Astronomy Laboratory in the town of Agliana and the coordinator of the planetarium project in Monsummano Terme. || 
|-id=423
| 60423 Chvojen ||  || Chvojen, a small Czech village in the Benešov District of central Bohemia. The first settlement there dates back to the Celts. St. Jacob and Philip Church in Chvojen, built in 1217, is known for medieval wall paintings, including Leviathan and Ptolemy Solar System. || 
|}

60501–60600 

|-id=558
| 60558 Echeclus ||  || Echeclus, centaur who attended Pirithous' wedding, fought against the Lapiths, and was killed by Ampyx (Amycus), son of Ophion || 
|}

60601–60700 

|-id=609
| 60609 Kerryprice ||  || Kerry Price (born 1939), an accomplished jazz singer who has performed with numerous dixieland jazz bands in southern Michigan over the last 50 years. She is also the music director for a church in suburban Detroit, Michigan. || 
|-id=614
| 60614 Tomshea ||  || Thomas Shea (1931–1982) was an American ragtime composer best known for his "prairie ragtime" style and the more than 20 "rags" he composed. He was active in ragtime and jazz in the Detroit, Michigan area throughout the 1960s and 1970s. || 
|-id=622
| 60622 Pritchet ||  || Christopher J. Pritchet (born 1950), a Canadian professor of physics and astronomy at the University of Victoria and a leading authority in the field of observational cosmology, supernovae, galaxy formation and evolution. || 
|-id=669
| 60669 Georgpick ||  || Georg Alexander Pick (1859–1942), an Austrian mathematician who worked in Prague, is best known for his theorem for determining the area of lattice polygons. In 1911 he invited Albert Einstein to Prague and introduced him to the field of absolute differential calculus, which later helped Einstein to formulate general relativity. || 
|}

60701–60800 

|-bgcolor=#f2f2f2
| colspan=4 align=center | 
|}

60801–60900 

|-bgcolor=#f2f2f2
| colspan=4 align=center | 
|}

60901–61000 

|-id=972
| 60972 Matenko || 2000 KN || Alexander Pravda (born 1961), a Slovak astronomer and friend of the discoverers Adrián Galád and Peter Kolény, with whom he had co-discovered several minor planets until 1998. As a keen observer, he was fascinated by the changes in cometary appearance. His friends were inspired by his wide range of interests, including music and painting. || 
|}

References 

060001-061000